The Norwegian Police Federation is the trade union which organizes employees from all levels within the police force. The federation is a member of the Confederation of Unions for Professionals, Norway and the European Confederation of Police. It is illegal for police officers to strike. The organization was established in 1997. Arne Johannessen was head of the organisation from 2000 to May 2013.

References

Trade unions in Norway
Police unions
Law enforcement in Norway
1997 establishments in Norway
Organisations based in Oslo
Trade unions established in 1997